Mir Makan (also Romanized as Mīr Makān) is a village in Boli Rural District, Chavar District, Ilam County, Ilam Province, Iran. At the 2006 census, its population was 107, in 19 families. The village is populated by Kurds.

References 

Populated places in Ilam County
Kurdish settlements in Ilam Province